Emile Lejeune (1853–1916) was a United States Navy sailor and a recipient of the United States military's highest decoration, the Medal of Honor.

A native of France, Lejeune joined the U.S. Navy from New York. By June 6, 1876, he was serving as a seaman on  commanded by Captain Edward Barrett. On that day, he and other crewmen took Plymouth's steam-powered launch to shore at Port Royal, South Carolina. While there, Lejeune rescued a civilian who had fallen off the Port Royal wharf. For this action, he was awarded the Medal of Honor, proposed by Edward Barrett three days later, on June 9.

Lejeune's official Medal of Honor citation reads:
Serving on board the U.S.S. Plymouth, Lejeune displayed gallant conduct in rescuing a citizen from drowning at Port Royal, S.C., 6 June 1876.

See also

List of Medal of Honor recipients in non-combat incidents

References

External links

1853 births
1916 deaths
French emigrants to the United States
United States Navy sailors
United States Navy Medal of Honor recipients
French-born Medal of Honor recipients
Non-combat recipients of the Medal of Honor